Weimyia is a genus of flies in the family Stratiomyidae.

Species
Weimyia bispinosa James, 1978

References

Stratiomyidae
Brachycera genera
Diptera of Australasia